Baghdad High School for Girls is a girls' school in Mansour, Baghdad, Iraq.

Characteristics of the school

In 2004, a reporter visiting the school said that most of the girls attending were daughters of government officials and wealthy, prominent people. The reporter said that fewer than half of the girls at the school wore hijabs and that the school was like an Iraqi equivalent of Vogue and "Beverly Hills High 90210". She noted that 98% of pupils continue to university, mostly to study medicine, engineering, science and technology.

Notable former pupils

 Nada Shabout, art historian

References

Girls' schools in Iraq
Schools in Baghdad
Educational institutions established in 1925
1920s establishments in Iraq